Paracinema is a genus of band-winged grasshoppers in the family Acrididae. There are at least three described species in Paracinema.

Species
These species belong to the genus Paracinema:
 Paracinema acutipennis (Bolívar, 1914)
 Paracinema luculenta Karsch, 1896
 Paracinema tricolor (Thunberg, 1815)

References

Further reading

External links

 

Acrididae
Caelifera genera